Jóhann Birnir Guðmundsson (born 5 December 1977) is a retired Icelandic footballer, who last played as a midfielder for Icelandic club Keflavík.

Jóhann previously played for Watford F.C. in the Football League First Division. He scored two goals for Watford, both of which came in the same game against Port Vale.

References

External links
 
 

1977 births
Living people
Johann Gudmundsson
Association football midfielders
Johann Gudmundsson
Johann Gudmundsson
Johann Gudmundsson
Johann Gudmundsson
Johann Gudmundsson
Watford F.C. players
Cambridge United F.C. players
Lyn Fotball players
Örgryte IS players
GAIS players
Johann Gudmundsson
Premier League players
Allsvenskan players
Eliteserien players
Expatriate footballers in Norway
Expatriate footballers in Sweden
Expatriate footballers in England
Iceland international footballers